Sir William Milne (17 May 1822 – 23 April 1895) was an Australian entrepreneur and politician, serving as the member for Onkaparinga in the South Australian House of Assembly from 1857 to 1868. He was elected to the South Australian Legislative Council in 1869, and was President of the South Australian Legislative Council from 25 July 1873 to 1881.

Life
Born in Wester-Common, near Glasgow, Milne was educated in Glasgow and emigrated to South Australia, arriving in the Palmyra at Port Adelaide on 29 October 1839, where he married Eliza Disher on 4 March 1842. He formed a partnership with brother-in-law James Disher as wine merchants and as "Disher & Milne", in July 1846, purchased the Hindley Street wine and spirit business of Patrick Auld, who was returning to England. The business was highly successful, eventually becoming Milne and Company.

In 1857 Milne sold his distillery and was elected to the South Australian House of Assembly as one of the members for Onkaparinga. Milne served as commissioner of Crown Lands and immigration in the ministry of John Baker from 21 August to 1 September 1857, under Richard Hanson from 5 July 1859 to 9 May 1860, under Henry Ayers from 22 July to 4 August 1864 and under James Boucaut from 28 March 1866 to 3 May 1867. In the ministry of George Waterhouse, Milne served as Commissioner of Public Works from 19 February 1862 to 4 July 1863, and in the Arthur Blyth ministry from 4 August 1864 to 22 March 1865.

Milne transferred to the Legislative Council in 1869 and was elected its president in 1873, serving until his retirement in 1881. Milne served as chief secretary in the John Hart ministry from 30 May 1870 to 10 November 1871 and under Blyth from 10 November 1871 to 22 January 1872.

When Milne was in the Crown Lands Department, he introduced a regulation to encourage farmers to buy land; introduced an amendment to the Scab in Sheep Act which helped to eliminate the disease; and introduced drainage to reclaim tracts of land.

Milne was a member of the Agricultural and Horticultural Society and its president from 1860 to 1861.

Knighted in 1876, Milne died at "Eurilla", Mount Lofty, in 1895.

Family
William Milne married Eliza Disher (c. 1818 – 17 August 1912), daughter of John Disher of "Byethorne", Nairne, South Australia in 1842; they later lived at "Sunnyside", Glen Osmond; they had a large family:
Eliza Amelia Milne ( – ) married John Randal Phillips on 20 August 1863
Ellen Wardlaw Milne ( – ) married W. H. Bundey on 28 March 1865
Margaret Jane Milne (1847– ) married Frederick Algernon Price on 16 July 1872
William Milne (1849 – 14 December 1905) married Emma Sophia Simpson (1850 – 8 September 1914), daughter of Capt. Henry Simpson on 17 March 1870
Mary Isabella Milne (1850 – c. 25 September 1869)
Barbara Agnes Milne (1852 – ) married Arthur Ernest Ayers on 30 April 1878
John Milne (3 November 1854 – 12 July 1934) married Lucy Anne Macgeorge (4 September 1859 – ) on 11 November 1875.
Rev. John Philip Milne (c. 1878 – c. 1 September 1924) worked among poor in London
George S(tanley) Milne (9 May 1879 – 1961) married Alice Belle Greenland,  Inspector of Ships, South Africa
L(eslie) Hugh Milne (1882– ) served in South Africa 1901, Inspector of Fisheries at Swansea, Wales.
Lucy Edith Milne (1884 – 1961) married Kenneth James Stephen in 1918, lived in Blackwood.
F(rank) Kenneth Milne (18 July 1885 – 3 October 1980) married Hazel Muir Fotheringham in 1913, he was an architect, lived in Kensington Gardens.
Kenneth Lancelot Milne was founding president of the SA division of the Australian Democrats, and MLC 1979-85.
E(rnest) Malcolm Milne (c. 1886–1963) married Gladys Burden on 1 March 1910, lived at Glenelg
Mary Elizabeth Milne ( –1955) married Harold Powell in 1914, lived in Largs Bay
George Milne (23 August 1856 – 17 August 1934) married Georgina Ellen Swinden on 14 June 1884.
Clive Gordon Milne (19 February 1885 – 12 March 1933)
Roy Melville Milne (19 February 1885 – 2 April 1938) noted racehorse owner
James Wilson Milne (1857– ) 
Florence Marion/Marian? Milne (1859 – ) married John Lancelot Stirling on 12 December 1882  
Blanche Maud Milne (21 August 1861 – ) married Robert Lomax Scott on 6 February 1890

Eliza Milne's sister Margaret "Minnie" Disher (died 11 April 1900) married James Johnston (1818 – 12 April 1891), one of the Johnston brothers of Oakbank.

References

 

1822 births
1895 deaths
Members of the South Australian House of Assembly
Members of the South Australian Legislative Council
Presidents of the South Australian Legislative Council
Politicians from Glasgow
Scottish emigrants to colonial Australia
Settlers of South Australia
19th-century Australian businesspeople
19th-century Australian politicians